Tiaprofenic acid is a nonsteroidal anti-inflammatory drug (NSAID) of the arylpropionic acid (profen) class, used to treat pain, especially arthritic pain. The typical adult dose is 300 mg twice daily. It is not recommended in children.

Long-term use of tiaprofenic acid is associated with severe cystitis, roughly 100 times more commonly than other NSAIDs. It is contraindicated in patients with cystitis and urinary tract infections. It is sparingly metabolised in the liver to two inactive metabolites. Most of the drug is eliminated unchanged in the urine. Renal disease impairs excretion, and it should be used with caution in renal disease.

It was patented in 1969 and approved for medical use in 1981. It is available in generic formulations. A sustained-release preparation is available. It is an isomer of Suprofen.

References

External links 
 Manufacturer Data Sheet 

Nonsteroidal anti-inflammatory drugs
Diarylketones
Thiophenes